ISO 4 (Information and documentation — Rules for the abbreviation of title words and titles of publications) is an international standard which defines a uniform system for the abbreviation of serial publication titles, i.e., titles of publications such as scientific journals that are published in regular installments.

The International Organization for Standardization (ISO) has appointed the ISSN International Centre as the registration authority for ISO 4. It maintains the List of Title Word Abbreviations (LTWA), which contains standard abbreviations for words commonly found in serial titles. , the standard's most recent update came in 1997, when its third edition was released.

A major use of ISO 4 is to abbreviate the names of scientific journals using the LTWA. For instance, under ISO 4 standards, the Journal of Biological Chemistry is cited as J. Biol. Chem., and the Journal of Polymer Science Part A should be cited as J. Polym. Sci. A (capitalization is not specified by the standard). The standard notes that "Full stops shall only be used to indicate an abbreviation. Full stops may be omitted from abbreviated words in applications that require limited use of punctuation" (section 4.6).

It was initially published in 1972 (ISO 4:1972), with a second edition published in 1984 (ISO 4:1984), and the third edition in 1997 (ISO 4:1997).

See also 
 ISSN
 CODEN

References

External links 
 List of Title Word Abbreviations
 Text of the standard (third edition, 1997)

00004